Francisco Wagsley Rodrigues de Sousa Filho (born 3 September 1989), commonly known as Francisco Torres, is a Brazilian professional footballer who plays as a forward for Kuwait Premier League club Al-Nasr.

Career

Badak Lampung
On 4 April 2019, Torres made his first career by arriving in Indonesia after made his career in Campeonato Brasileiro Série D club Treze, then he signed a one year contract with Indonesian Liga 1 club Badak Lampung. On 21 June 2019, he made his debut by starting in a 1–2 win against Semen Padang. He finally scored his first goal for Badak Lampung in the second half, he scored in the 52nd minute. During his time with the club, he made 12 league appearances and scored four goals.

Barito Putera
On 4 September 2019, he made his first career by arriving in South Kalimantan, Indonesia after made his career with Badak Lampung, then he signed a one year contract with Indonesian Liga 1 club Barito Putera. On 14 September 2019, he made his debut by starting in a 2–2 draw against Madura United. And he also scored his first goal for the team, he scored in the 13rd minute from the penalty at the Gelora Bangkalan Stadium.

Borneo
In 2020, Torres signed a contract with Indonesian Liga 1 club Borneo. He made 3 league appearances and scored 2 goals for Borneo. This season was suspended on 27 March 2020 due to the COVID-19 pandemic. The season was abandoned and was declared void on 20 January 2021.

Dhaka Abahani
Torres joined Bangladesh Premier League club Dhaka Abahani in November 2020. He made 12 league appearances and scored seven goals for Dhaka Abahani.

Return to Borneo
On 23 May 2021, it was confirmed that Torres would re-join Borneo, signing a year contract. Torres made his debut on 4 September 2021 in a match against Persebaya Surabaya. On 17 September 2021, Torres scored his first goal for Borneo against Barito Putera in the 83rd minute from the penalty at the Wibawa Mukti Stadium.

References

External links

Brazilian footballers
1989 births
Living people
People from Baturité
Brazilian expatriate footballers
Sportspeople from Ceará
Esporte Clube São Luiz players
Myllykosken Pallo −47 players
Mikkelin Palloilijat players
Horizonte Futebol Clube players
CSM Ceahlăul Piatra Neamț players
GAIS players
Al-Wehdat SC players
Al Jahra SC players
Al-Nasr SC (Kuwait) players
Al Urooba Club players
Treze Futebol Clube players
Badak Lampung F.C. players
PS Barito Putera players
Borneo F.C. players
Abahani Limited (Dhaka) players
Campeonato Brasileiro Série C players
Veikkausliiga players
Liga II players
Superettan players
Jordanian Pro League players
Kuwait Premier League players
UAE First Division League players
Liga 1 (Indonesia) players
Bangladesh Football Premier League players
Brazilian expatriate sportspeople in Finland
Expatriate footballers in Finland
Brazilian expatriate sportspeople in Romania
Expatriate footballers in Romania
Brazilian expatriate sportspeople in Sweden
Expatriate footballers in Sweden
Brazilian expatriate sportspeople in Jordan
Expatriate footballers in Jordan
Brazilian expatriate sportspeople in Kuwait
Expatriate footballers in Kuwait
Brazilian expatriate sportspeople in the United Arab Emirates
Expatriate footballers in the United Arab Emirates
Brazilian expatriate sportspeople in Indonesia
Expatriate footballers in Indonesia
Brazilian expatriate sportspeople in Bangladesh
Expatriate footballers in Bangladesh
Association football forwards